Blas Ruiz de Hernán González or Blas Ruiz de Fernán González was an explorer from Ciudad Real, Spain.

Travels
In the last decade of the 16th century, along with the Portuguese adventurer Diogo Veloso from Amarante, Blas Ruiz was the first European to ever set foot in Laos.

Ruiz's journey to Laos started in Cambodia. In Cambodia, Ruiz met and befriended King Satha of Lovek and Veloso of Portugal. When Lovek was invaded by Ayutthaya, Satha was overthrown by his son and other nobles who allowed Ayutthaya to take control, forcing Ruiz to flee to the Spanish colony of the Philippines, the place where he began his adventure in Southeast Asia. Eventually Ruiz returned with Veloso, who had fled to the Portuguese colony of Melaka, to Lovek. When they arrived they learned Satha had fled to Lan Xang, an empire centered in modern-day Laos and consisting of Isan, Stung Treng, and small areas of Southern China and Vietnam. Ruiz and Veloso decided to journey to Laos and bring back Satha to restore his reign over Lovek.

Ruiz and Veloso arrived in Vientiane, Lan Xang's administrative capital, in the summer of 1596. They were met with a procession showing off the city's immense wealth consisting of Asian Elephants, gold, jewels, silk, exotic snakes, bouquets of tropical flowers, chanting monks, Buddhist treasures and relics, music, and beautiful women. Ruiz and Veloso were also received with a great feast. But while they were in Vientiane they learned Satha had died from an illness he caught on his way from Cambodia to Laos. Saddened and angered by the news, Ruiz and Veloso returned to Lovek and started a rebellion to put one of Satha's political allies on the throne and free Cambodia from Ayatthaya. They managed to drive out Ayutthaya forces from parts of Cambodia and create a new state but led the new Cambodian state into a brief period of chaos. Eventually Ruiz returned to the Philippines. It is not known whether he died there, Spain, or somewhere else.

In July 1593 king Satha I sent an embassy to Manila asking for Spanish military help to defend Cambodia. The embassy consisted of Portuguese Diogo Veloso, who had been living in his court since 1583, and Spanish Gregorio de Vargas Machuca. Satha I kept Spanish Blas Ruiz de Hernan Gonzalez as captain of his bodyguard. Veloso came back in February 1594, alone and without help. After Ayutthaya's attack on Cambodia, Veloso, Blas Ruiz and de Vargas Machuca found themselves in Manila. They continued to ask for help, and at last, Spanish Manila agreed to send 3 ships with 120 Spanish and Mexican soldiers, some Japanese and Filipino auxiliaries and some friars, under the commander Suarez Gallinato. The ship with Blas Ruiz was the only one that reached Cambodia. The one with Veloso was wrecked off the Mekong delta and Gallinato's ship was forced to go to Malacca due to the weather. Veloso rejoined Blas Ruiz at Phnom Penh in March 1596. At this point there is no evidence of their fate. They could be killed at Phnom Penh in July 1599 during a fight between Christians (Spanish and Filipinos) and Muslim Malay mercenaries of Barom Reacha II, who was Satha's son. Or they could return to Philippines. Satha had died in October 1597 after contracting disease after he fled to Lan Xang.

See also
Lovek

References

Bibliography
Miguel de Jaque de los Rios Manzanedo Viaje de las Indias Orientales y Occidentales (Año 1606) REF.: LVI-5
JOAQUIN MAÑES POSTIGO, LA QUIMERA DE UN REINO. DE LIBRUM TREMENS 2008.  - Historical novel based on the adventures of Blas Ruiz

Explorers of Asia
Spanish explorers
16th-century explorers
16th-century Spanish people
History of Laos